Parachela oxygastroides, also known as the glass fish, is a freshwater fish of the family Cyprinidae. It is found in Southeast Asia in rivers and wetlands, including seasonally flooded forests. Of length 10–20 cm, it is caught commercially for food and sold in markets; it is one of the species used in Cambodian cuisine to make the fish paste prahok.

References

Fish described in 1852
Fish of Southeast Asia
Cyprinid fish of Asia